Ottaviano Tenerani (born 14 February 1969, in Pontedera, Italy) is an Italian keyboard player, conductor, musicologist. He is the leader of Il Rossignolo, an ensemble on period instruments that he founded in 1998 together with the flautist Marica Testi and the recorder and oboe player Martino Noferi.

Biography 
Ottaviano Tenerani who has specialized in the interpretation of baroque and classical music, is active both as performer and researcher. He has appeared as conductor and keyboard player in hundreds of concerts and numerous recordings for labels such as Sony Classical. / Deutsche Harmonia Mundi, CPO, Tactus, Brilliant Classics, and Dynamic.

Much involved in musicological research, he has presented modern day first performances of vocal and instrumental music by Alessandro Scarlatti, Georg Friedrich Händel, Antonio Caldara, Johann Joachim Quantz, Giovanni Battista Sammartini, Orazio Caccini and Giovanni Battista Martini.

He discovered the serenade Germanico, attributed to Händel, that he recorded with Il Rossignolo in 2011 for Sony Classical. The critical acclaim won by this recording launched further collaboration between Tenerani (with Il Rossignolo) and Sony Classical with the recording of the complete solo sonatas by Georg Friedrich Händel (released in August 2019)  and other music from the unedited sacred and secular Italian repertoires.

Teaching 
Ottaviano Tenerani is professor of historical keyboard, chamber music and curator of the collection of musical instruments at the Accademia Internazionale d’Organo e Musica Antica Giuseppe Gherardeschi in Pistoia and teach in several master classes and academies. Since 2008, he has had an affiliation with the Istituto Superiore di Studi Musicali Rinaldo Franci  in Siena providing master classes in historical performance practice and harpsichord. In the same Conservatory he is involved as conductor in early music orchestral projects

Discography (selective) 
Georg Friedrich Händel, Complete solo sonatas, Il Rossignolo, SONY - DHM  
Georg Philipp Telemann, Telemann virtuoso, Il Rossignolo, Brilliant Classics
Georg Friedrich Händel, Germanico, Il Rossignolo, SONY - DHM  
Giovanni Battista Sammartini, Notturni a quattro, Il Rossignolo, Brilliant Classic - Tactus 
Antonio Vivaldi, I concerti per violino et organo obligato / Sonate per flauto diritto, Il Rossignolo, Tactus 
Benedetto Marcello, Sonate per flauto e basso op 2 / Opere per clavicembalo, Il Rossignolo, Tactus
AAVV, Le sonate per flauto diritto, flauto traverso e basso, Il Rossignolo, Orfeo
Alessandro Scarlatti, Concerti e Sinfonie, Il Rossignolo, CPO
Giovanni Battista Martini, Sinfonie a quattro, Il Rossignolo, Tactus
Giovanni Battista Martini, Sei Sonate per l’organo e il cembalo, Tactus
Orazio Caccini, Madrigali et Canzonette a cinque voci, Il Rossignolo, EMA
Francesco Maria Veracini, Violin Sonatas, Musica Antiqua Roma, SONY - DHM

Critical editions and Essays 
Mozart gioca a dadi, musica e calcolo combinatorio nel XVIII secolo. Sergio Giudici e Ottaviano Tenerani. In "Musica, Scienza e Linguaggio” - Polifonica - ETS - Pisa, 2022 
Il temperamento: una questione musicale, scientifica e didattica. Sergio Giudici e Ottaviano Tenerani. In "Musica, Scienza e Linguaggio” - Polifonica - ETS - Pisa, 2022 
Lo spinettone firmato Giovanni Ferrini dell'Accademia Internazionale Giuseppe Gherardeschi di Pistoia, in "Il cembalo a martelli da Bartolomeo Cristofori a Giovanni Ferrini - Pendragon, Bologna, 2019
Charles Antoine Campion, L'Etruria fortunata - Hollitzer Wissenschaftsverlag, Wien, 2013
Una serata in Camerata - Hollitzer Wissenschaftsverlag, Wien, 2013
Georg Friedrich Händel (attr.), Germanico - Edizioni Il Rossignolo, Montopoli 2010
Giovanni Battista Sammartini, 7 Notturni a quattro - Armelin Musica, Padova, 2009
Johann Joachim Quantz , 7 Triosonate per Flauto, Violino e Basso Continuo (Flauto e Clavicembalo) - Ut Orpheus, Bologna, 2002
Oratio Caccini Romano, Madrigali et canzonette a cinque voci, a cura di: Ottaviano Tenerani e Marica Testi, San Miniato, 1998.

References

External links 
Il Rossignolo website
Ottaviano Tenerani su Bibliothèque Nationale de France
La Cantata Celebrativa nel settecento

1969 births
Living people
Baroque musicians
Italian male musicians
20th-century Italian male musicians
21st-century Italian male musicians
Italian harpsichordists
Fortepianists
Italian conductors (music)